Rasmussen's aneurysm is a pulmonary artery aneurysm associated with a cavitary lung lesion. It was originally described by Fritz Valdemar Rasmussen in association with cavitary lung lesions of tuberculosis, and was described in up to 5% of autopsies of those with chronic tuberculosis. As with any aneurysm, a Rasmussen's aneurysm is at increased risk of rupture and bleeding into the lungs.

Pulmonary artery aneurysms are rare. Historically, pulmonary artery aneurysms were believed to be a common cause of hemoptysis (or coughing up blood) in tuberculosis. They may in fact have been more common prior to the use of antibiotics. Current understanding is that most hemoptysis is related to bleeding from the systemic bronchial arteries of the lung.

While the "classic" terminology relates the lesion to cavitary tuberculosis, the term is now used for the anatomic aneurysm associated with other destructive lung lesions.  Even when the pulmonary aneurysm is present, the actual bronchial  bleeding may be from the bronchial artery, rather than from the pulmonary artery.

References 

Vascular diseases
Tuberculosis